Chamba district is the northwestern district of Himachal Pradesh, in India, with its headquarters in Chamba town. The towns of Dalhousie, Khajjhiar and Churah Valley are popular hill stations and vacation spots for the people from the plains of northern India.

Economy
In 2006 the Ministry of Panchayati Raj named Chamba one of the country's 250 most backward districts (out of a total of 640). It is one of the two districts in Himachal Pradesh currently receiving funds from the Backward Regions Grant Fund Programme (BRGF).

Demographics

According to the 2011 census Chamba district has a population of 519,080, roughly equal to the nation of Cape Verde. This gives it a ranking of 544th in India (out of a total of 640). Its population growth rate over the decade 2001–2011 was 12.58%. Chamba has a sex ratio of 989 females for every 1000 males, and a literacy rate of 73.19%. 6.96% of the population lived in urban areas. Scheduled Castes and Scheduled Tribes made up 21.52% and 26.10% of the population respectively. The Gaddis, the largest Scheduled Tribe in Himachal Pradesh, mainly live in Chamba district.

Languages

The majority of the people of the district are native speakers of languages in the Himachali group. These primarily include Chambeali (the first language reported by 23% of the population in the 2011 census), Gaddi or Bharmauri (22%), Churahi (14%), Pangwali (3.5%) and Bhateali (2.9%). Other languages spoken are Hindi (2.9%), Gujari (1.9%), Kashmiri (1.3%) and Punjabi (1.1%).

Politics 

 

|}

Education

Schools
 Minority School Juwans Muslim Minority Educational Center Juwans Kihar district Chamba,

Interesting places
 Laxmi Narayan Temple : It is the most famous tourist attraction place in Chamba. There are six temples dedicated to Lord Shiva and Lord Vishnu. Three temples are dedicated to Lord Vishnu, and another three to Lord Shiva.
 Gandhi Gate : The Viceroy of British Government Lord Curzon received a warm welcome by a bright orange gateway built in 1900, known as Gandhi gate. It is the main gateway of Chamba.

A yet another place of interest in Chamba town is the Bhuri Singh Museum at Chamba which came into existence on 14 September 1908. It is named after Raja Bhuri Singh who ruled Chamba from 1904 to 1919. Bhuri Singh donated his family collection of paintings to the museum. The embroidered Chamba-Rumals are related in style since their drawings were made by pahari painters though the embroidery was done by the household ladies.

Salooni is 56 km from Chamba.

Khajjiar is mini Switzerland in Chamba. Bhalei Mata Temple is famous in Chamba. It is 35 km from Chamba. Chhudra is 25 km from Chamba.

Fair and festivals 

Chamba is famous for its vivid festivals. The Suhi Mata festival is held for four days in March/April every year in memory of princess Sui. She is known to have sacrificed her life for the cause of her people, that is, the people of Chamba.

At the time of the harvest of the maize crop which is the main crop of this region the local people in order to show their happiness and to enjoy after a hard toil celebrate. the festival is named as Minjar festival.

 Chaurasi Temple : Nestled on the bank of the river Ravi, Chamba town complete 1000 years of its existence. The town stands on a plateau on the right bank of the Ravi river valley between Dhauladhar and Zanskar ranges south of the inner Himalayas. This town was founded by Raja Sahil Varman in the beginning of 10th century. In the genealogical rolls of the Chamba Rajas, a reference occurs of place, which was adorned with highly fragrant Champaka trees and guarded by Goddess Champavati.

The temple was built by Sahil Varman in the honour of his daughter Champavati who is worshipped as a goddess in Chamba. This journey of one thousand years is a repository a civilised, cultured and developed society which existed in the lap of the Himalayas. The unique architect of houses and temples, splendid wood and metal craft, world fame Chamba Rumal and Chappal and the pahari paintings are some salient features of this one thousand years young town.

The Chamba town has a number of temples, Palaces and stylised buildings. Laxmi Narayana Temple, which is the main temple of Chamba town, was built by Sahil Varman in the 10th century AD. There are several other temples within the complex.

The temple of Radha Krishna, Shiva Temple of Chandergupta and Gauri Shankar Temple are among these. The ancient temple of Vajreshwari is believed to be 1000 years old and is dedicated to Devi Vajreshwari-Goddess of lightning.

The Sui Mata temple can be divided into three parts which can physically spread apart. The Hari Rai temple is dedicated to Lord Vishnu and dates back to 11th century.

Reference of Chamba town would be incomplete without the majestic Chaugan. It is the heart and hub centre of all activities in Chamba. Tradition is silent as to its use as a polo ground and the name is etymologically distinct from Chaugan, the Persian name of Polo, being of Sanskrit origin and meaning 'four-sided'. Initially the five Chaugan were a single patch of meadow.

To mark the completion of 1000 years of this town, the Government of Himachal Pradesh had celebrated the millennium of this town from 14 to 20 April 2006 in a most befitting way. The celebrations has provided the people the opportunity to have a firsthand knowledge of the rich cultural and historical past of the Chamba town.

Notable residents
Chamba district is represented in Lok Sabha by the Member of Parliament elected from Kangra (Lok Sabha constituency). Earlier it is represented for first 4 elections to Lok Sabha as member elected from Chamba (Lok Sabha constituency). The MP elected from Chamba seat were A. R Sewal in 1952, Padam Dev in 1957, Chattar Singh in 1962 and Vikram Chand Mahajan in 1967.

References

External links

 District profile of Chamba

 
Districts of Himachal Pradesh